E41, E-41 or E.41 may refer to:
 HMS E41, a United Kingdom Royal Navy E-class submarine which saw service during World War I
 European route E41, a road in Germany and Switzerland
 DB Class E 41, a locomotive manufactured in Germany
 Nimzo-Indian Defense, Encyclopaedia of Chess Openings code
 Tōkai-Hokuriku Expressway and Nōetsu Expressway, route E41 in Japan
 Long Win Bus Route E41 in Hong Kong